Anna Katarina Bartels née Fernquist (1869–1950) was a Swedish operatic soprano. She made her debut at the Royal Swedish Opera in 1897 in the title role of Friedrich von Flotow's Martha. Engaged by the company for the next 20 years, she gained popularity as a soubrette and coloratura soprano but later turned increasingly to mezzo-soprano roles. In 1923, she was awarded the Litteris et Artibus medal.

Early life and education
Born on 9 December 1869 in Gävle, Anna Fernquist was the daughter of the manufacturer Carl Johannes Fernquist and his wife Charlotta née Larsson. In 1902, she married the Swedish painter .

She studied first in Gäfle under the music teacher Wilhelm Björkgren (1886–87), then in Stockholm under Miss Achorn (1891–92), Signe Hebbe (1893) and Emilie Mechelin (1894–95) and later in Baden-Baden and Paris under Désirée Artôt (1899–1901).

Career

In 1897 she made her debut at the Royal Swedish Opera in Stockholm in title role of Martha. For the next 20 years she performed with the company, first gaining popularity in soprano roles but later also appearing as a  mezzo-soprano. She performed in several Swedish premieres: Musette in Puccini's La bohème (1901), Woglinde in Wagner's Rheingold (1901), Fattoumah in Henri Rabaud's Mârouf (1915), Marianne in Richard Strauss's Der Rosenkavalier (1920) and La Ciesca in Puccini's Gianni Schicchi (1920). Other roles included Fru Fluth in Otto Nicolai's The Merry Wives of Windsor, The Queen of the Night in Mozart's The Magic Flute, Susanna in his The Marriage of Figaro, Elvira in his Don Giovanni, Philine in Ambroise Thomas's Mignon, Micaela in Bizet's Carmen and Juno in Jacques Offenbach's Orpheus in the Underworld.

Bartels is also remembered for her appearances in concerts and lieder recitals. After retiring from the stage in the early 1920s, she taught voice in Stockholm.

Anna Bartels died in Rådmansö in Norrtälje Municipality on 17 February 1950.

Awards
In 1923, for her contributions to Swedish culture, she was awarded the Litteris et Artibus medal.

References

1869 births
1950 deaths
People from Gävle
Swedish operatic sopranos
19th-century Swedish opera singers
20th-century Swedish opera singers
Litteris et Artibus recipients